Linde Air Products Factory, also known as the Chandler Street Plant, is a historic liquid oxygen factory building in the Black Rock neighborhood of Buffalo, Erie County, New York. It was listed on the National Register of Historic Places in 2017.

The original two-story section was built in 1907 of solid masonry construction with double-hung wood windows, brick piers, and pitched roofs. Red brick additions were made to the original building through 1948. The present building has a C-shaped plan that is nearly fully enclosed around a center courtyard and measuring approximately 300 feet wide by 275 feet deep. 

The building housed the first oxygen extraction facility in America and was later dubbed "the birthplace of the oxygen industry in the United States." It also served as the primary research facility for the Linde Air Products Company from 1923 until 1942. The building has been redeveloped as a kombucha brewery, cider works, orthodontic laboratory, loft apartments and utilant llc (insurtech company..

References

External links
Buffalo Rising: Construction Watch: 155 Chandler Street (February 2018)
Buffalo Rising: 1st Chandler Street Project Reaches Completion (August 2018)
Buffalo as an Architectural Museum: Linde Air Manufacturing

Linde plc
Industrial buildings and structures on the National Register of Historic Places in New York (state)
Industrial buildings completed in 1907
Buildings and structures in Buffalo, New York
National Register of Historic Places in Buffalo, New York